Kovsie FM 97.0 is a campus/community radio station in Bloemfontein, South Africa.  The station is located on the grounds of the University of the Free State and broadcasts to a radius of about 80 km

Kovsie FM was founded in 1978 by a group of students, and broadcast only inside the cafeteria.  In 1995 it was granted a license by the IBA, now called ICASA (Independent Communications Authority of South Africa) granting Kovsie FM a broadcasting license on the frequency 97.0 FM.

Kovsie FM 97.0 broadcasts in English, Afrikaans and Sotho, and their focus is on the youth between the ages of 15–35.  Their mission includes community involvement, training and development, being a platform for local musicians, providing an accurate, unbiased news service, and sustainability.

The station employs 8 full-time personnel, including a station manager (Gerben Van Niekerk), programming manager (JayBee Mohlante), marketing manager (Thendo Limbo), music manager, production manager (Morena Sprinkaan), sports editor and news editor.

Coverage areas and frequencies

Coverage 
Bloemfontein 
Brandfort
Winburg
Parts of Dewetsdorp

Frequency
97.0 FM

Broadcast languages
English
Afrikaans
Sotho

Broadcast time
24/7

Target audience
LSM Groups 6 – 10
Age Group 14 – 35
 Scholars, students, young working adults

Programme format
80% Music
20% Talk

Listenership figures

Location
Thakaneng Bridge, University of the Free State, Bloemfontein, Free State

References

External links 
Kovsie FM 97.0 Facebook Page
Kovsie FM 97.0 Live Streaming
Student Radio Network
SAARF Website
Sentech Website

Community radio stations in South Africa
Radio stations in Bloemfontein
Student radio stations in South Africa
University of the Free State
Radio stations established in 1978